Epic is the sixth studio album by Norwegian heavy metal band Borknagar. It was released in 2004 on Century Media Records.

Bassist Jan Erik "Tyr" Tiwaz left the band during recording sessions for the album; all bass parts on the album were subsequently played by drummer Asgeir Mickelson. Mickelson and vocalist Andreas "Vintersorg" Hedlund also contribute additional guitar playing to compensate for the departure of former guitarist Jens F. Ryland.

Track listing

Personnel

Borknagar
Andreas Hedlund (credited as "Vintersorg") – vocals, additional guitar
Øystein G. Brun – acoustic guitar, electric guitar, high-string guitar
Lars A. Nedland – backing vocals, keyboards, synthesizer, Hammond organ, grand piano
Asgeir Mickelson – drums, percussion, five-string bass, fretless bass, additional guitar

Production
Borknagar - production, mixing
Borge Finstad - production, mixing, engineer
Morten Lund - mastering
Christophe Szpajdel – logo

References

External links
Borknagar-Epic (2006 6th Album at the Official Borknagar Website)

Borknagar albums
2004 albums
Century Media Records albums